Bradford Festival Choral Society was founded as a direct result of the opening of St George's Hall in 1853.  A massed choir of over 200 singers from far and wide was formed for the first Bradford Musical Festival which took place that year.  When the second festival took place in 1856 another choir, consisting of rather more locally based singers, was formed and at the end of the festival it was felt wasteful to disband a group which had already gained such a high reputation.  A meeting was held on 17 November 1856 under the chairmanship of Samuel Smith, the original instigator of the construction of St George's Hall, and Bradford Festival Choral Society came into being with Mr Smith as its first President.  The conductor was William Jackson who had been the highly successful trainer of the chorus for both festivals.  The choir sang and rehearsed at the Hall and soon gained the nickname of the “Coffee and Bun Society” as refreshments were provided for those members travelling from a distance.  This arrangement was also intended to discourage possible visits to licensed premises before rehearsal!

The choir's rise to fame was so rapid that it was summoned to sing before Queen Victoria in June 1858.  It is hardly surprising that there was a sudden glut of applicants to join the Society and high standards could be demanded of singers.  The group left Bradford by special train on 28 June 1858 and performed at Buckingham Palace for the large royal party that same evening.  The concert was a huge success and the choir went on to sing twice at The Crystal Palace and also at St Martin's Hall, as well as at the Handel Festival, during the rest of its week-long stay in London.  On its return to Bradford, the choir repeated its London programme in St George’s Hall and Peel Park before the end of what must have been its annus mirabilis.

The next festival featuring the choir took place in 1859 and was an artistic success but, as is so often the case, was not rewarding in financial terms.  As a result, the next festival was postponed and eventually cancelled.  No more triennial festivals took place in Bradford.

Without festivals, the choir settled down to a regular routine of concerts in St George's Hall, the equilibrium only shattered by the sudden death of its conductor William Jackson in 1866.  Such was the esteem in which he was held that the Society undertook all the funeral arrangements and was also responsible for the monument in Undercliffe Cemetery and also the one in Masham – Jackson's birthplace.  Performances of Jackson’s oratorio, The Deliverance of Israel from Babylon, were given to raise money for these projects.

Shortly after this, in 1870, the close association with St George’s Hall was relaxed and, although the Hall remained the venue for concerts, rehearsals moved to the Mechanics’ Institute, where they remained for the next 100 years until the building was demolished.

In 1906 the choir was eagerly planning, in spite of great financial problems, celebrations for its Golden Jubilee.  Fortuitously, an invitation was received from the London Philharmonic Society to sing in the Queen’s Hall.  The Chairman, Henry J Mason, generously offered to fund the trip and 323 singers left by special train, reputed to be (at 200 yards long) the longest train ever to leave Bradford. The concert, consisting of the double motet Sing ye to the Lord (Bach) and Beethoven’s Choral Symphony, was greeted with acclaim and the choir returned home at 4am, no doubt exhausted.

In Bradford, the choir enjoyed celebratory concerts and a grand ball in St George’s Hall.  It was also during this jubilee year that it was presented with an original Schubert masterpiece by a former President, Mr W. M. Hertz.  This manuscript was later almost forgotten until it was rediscovered by the librarian at the time of the centenary and subsequently deposited in the Bradford Archives.  In 2005 it was deemed necessary to realise all possible assets in order to continue the work of the Society and the manuscript was sold.

The 20th century led to great changes.  The Society survived two World Wars with attendant problems of a lack of male singers and of blackout restrictions.  Sir Malcolm Sargent became the Society’s conductor in 1925 and was instrumental in raising the choir’s profile during the 26 years of his reign.  During this time too, BFCS had to leave St George’s Hall when it became a cinema in 1926.  A new home was found at Eastbrook Hall where the choir remained until the reopening of St George’s as a concert hall in 1953.  It was a real landmark when BFCS took part in the concert, broadcast by the BBC, to celebrate the opening.  In the same year, the choir had a great artistic triumph when it featured in the first live performance of Janáček’s Glagolitic Mass in Leeds Town Hall.

It was greatly appreciated that the centenary season could be held back in ‘the old home’ and celebratory concerts and a dinner were held.  The Society was set fair for another 100 years.

This certainly seemed the case as Sir David Willcocks took up the baton as the Society’s conductor.  During the time of his appointment he had a rapport with the choir and many were the successes over which he presided.  Two performances of Britten’s War Requiem, in 1964 and 1967, are particularly remembered.  It was appreciated that when Sir David Willcocks had to relinquish his position 17 years later, he still returned for many years to preside over the annual Carol Concert.

Other eminent conductors have been Sir Charles Groves, who conducted a memorable performance of Frederick Delius’ A Mass of Life, Richard Hickox, David Lloyd Jones, Brian Kay and guest conductors such as John Rutter, Meredith Davies, Sir John Barbirolli and many others.  Most of the great works in the choral repertoire have been performed and the choir has never flinched from singing contemporary works by Bliss, Julius Harrison, John Rutter, David Fanshawe and Peter Maxwell Davies to name but a few.

Recent years
Today Bradford Festival Choral Society is Bradford's largest choir and one of the biggest in the North of England. With a current singing membership of around 100 voices the choir performs all the major works in the choral repertoire at St George's Concert Hall and other venues in the Bradford area. The choir enjoys a busy season of concerts including major programmes in November and early Spring, concerts in the summer and at Christmas as well as Bradford's traditional Christmas performance of Handel's Messiah.

Since 2008 the choir has been enjoying a revival under the baton of its young and dynamic Musical Director Thomas Leech, who has led the choir into new musical territory while constantly encouraging excellent performances of choral classics. Choir membership and audience attendance continues to grow as the society re-establishes itself amongst the leading choral societies in the north of England. Recent performances have included the opening concert of the revived Bradford Festival in July 2013, traditional choral works, collaborations with living composers (including Duncan Druce - Mozart Requiem completion - and Will Todd - Mass in Blue), community projects (several long-term 'Learn to Sing' courses) and of course the core choral repertoire.

External links
Bradford Festival Choral Society

Organisations based in Bradford
Choral societies
Musical groups from West Yorkshire
Yorkshire choirs
Musical groups established in 1853
1853 establishments in England